#WhereIsPengShuai is a hashtag, used mainly in social media, and a grassroots campaign to raise awareness about the disappearance of Chinese tennis athlete, Peng Shuai (彭帥).

Purpose of the hashtag 

On November 2, 2021, Chinese tennis player, Peng Shuai, wrote in a social media post that politician Zhang Gaoli had sexually assaulted her three years previously. Approximately 30 minutes later the post disappeared and references to Peng Shuai disappeared from China's internet.

The hashtag, #WhereIsPengShuai (Where is Peng Shuai?), first appeared on Twitter on November 12, 2021. The next day, French professional tennis player Alize Cornet tweeted, "Let's not remain silent #WhereIsPengShuai". The hashtag was then quickly picked up and used by the tennis community and others to call attention to Peng Shuai's disappearance. Among those who did this in the following couple of days were Chris Evert, Nicolas Mahut, Naomi Osaka, Stan Wawrinka and Serena Williams.

Australian Open 

During the 2022 Australian Open, on 22 January, fans wearing t-shirts with the slogan "Where is Peng Shuai?" were asked to remove their shirts. A police officer at the scene was recorded saying, "The Australian Open does have a rule that you can't have political slogans ... it's a rule that it's a condition of entry." Tennis Australia backed up the police response. Later, Martina Navratilova stated, "I find it really, really cowardly. I think they are wrong on this. This is not a political statement, this is a human rights statement."

After an international outcry, Tennis Australian chief Craig Tiley reversed the decision and said fans are free to wear the t-shirts. However, signs on poles or "mobs" would not be allowed.

In response to the t-shirt controversy, a Chinese spokesman said, "The politicisation of sports will not succeed and will not gain support from the majority of people, including sportsmen and women, in the international community."

Multilingual use of the hashtag 

The hashtag appeared as #OùEstPengShuai in French media and #DondeEstaPengShuai in Spanish media.

China's response to the hashtag 

The name Peng Shuai was censored in China within 30 minutes of a social media post authored by Peng Shuai accusing former vice premier Zhang Gaoli of sexual assault. It is therefore assumed the hashtag, #WhereIsPengShuai remains unknown to Chinese citizens.

References 

Hashtags
Enforced disappearances in China
Tennis controversies